The Cook Partisan Voting Index, abbreviated Cook PVI, CPVI, or PVI, is a measurement of how strongly a United States congressional district or U.S. state leans toward the Democratic or Republican Party, compared to the nation as a whole, based on how that district or state voted in the previous two presidential elections.

The index is updated after each presidential election cycle, as well as after congressional redistricting. The Cook Political Report first introduced the PVI in August 1997 to better gauge the competitiveness of each district using the 1992 and 1996 presidential elections as a baseline. The most recent iteration is the 2022 Cook Partisan Voting Index, which was released with an updated formula for calculating PVI values.

Calculation and format
The Cook PVI is displayed as a letter, a plus sign, and a number. The letter (either a D for Democratic or an R for Republican) reflects the major party toward which the district (or state) leans. The number reflects the strength of that partisan preference in rounded percentage points. A district or state that "performed within half a point of the national average in either direction" is designated as "Even".

PVIs are calculated by comparing the lead candidate's average share of the two-party presidential vote in the past two presidential elections to the party's national average two-party share for those elections. In 2022, it was updated to weigh the most recent presidential election more heavily than the prior election.

By congressional district
The PVIs for congressional districts are calculated based on the 2016 and 2020 presidential elections. With a PVI of R+1,  was determined to be the median congressional district, meaning that exactly 217 districts are more Democratic and 217 are more Republican than this district. , in the House, there are 222 districts more Republican than the national average, and 206 districts more Democratic than the national average.  The number of swing seats, defined as those between D+5 and R+5, is 82.

By state
The PVIs for states are calculated based on the results of the U.S. presidential elections in 2016 and 2020. The table below reflects the current state of Congress and governors, based on the most recent election results.

Extremes and trends
With a Cook PVI value of R+25, Wyoming is the most Republican state in the nation. At D+16, Vermont is the most Democratic state, though Washington, D.C., is substantially more Democratic with a PVI value of D+43.

In the Senate, the most Republican-leaning state to have a Democratic senator is West Virginia (R+22 PVI), represented by Joe Manchin. The least Democratic-leaning state to have two Democratic senators is Georgia (R+3 PVI), represented by Jon Ossoff and Raphael Warnock. The most Democratic-leaning state to have a Republican senator is Maine (D+2 PVI), represented by Susan Collins. The least Republican-leaning states to have two Republican senators are Florida (R+3 PVI), represented by Marco Rubio and Rick Scott, and North Carolina (R+3 PVI), represented by Ted Budd and Thom Tillis.

See also
 Political party strength in U.S. states
 Psephology, the statistical analysis of elections
 Two-party-preferred vote

References

External links
 The Cook Political Report

Psephology
United States congressional districts
The Cook Political Report with Amy Walter